Noviherbaspirillum soli is a gram negative betaproteobacteria from the genus Noviherbaspirillum which was isolated from an old volcanic mountain soil on Tenerife on the Canary Islands. N. soli was found with Noviherbaspirillum canariense and Noviherbaspirillum aurantiacum together.

References

Burkholderiales
Bacteria described in 2012